Ukrainians in Belarus comprise one of the largest ethnic minorities in Belarus, making up 1.7% of the population as of the 2009 census at 158,723 people. The largest concentration of Ukrainians is in Brest Region, where they make up 2.9% of the population. The largest share of Ukrainians in the country was recorded in Kamieniets, Brest, Kobryn, and Zhabinka districts.

History 
Often, ethnic Ukrainians living in the territory of modern-day Belarus are singled out as a separate group. However, due to the cultural proximity and similarity of Belarusians and Ukrainians, difficulties arise in drawing ethnic boundaries between the two.

The majority of Ukrainians living in Belarus today are descendants of migrants from Ukraine, occurring due to the fact that Ukraine and Belarus were for centuries part of the same state. It is also known that many Zaporozhian Cossacks settled in the Dnieper region in the 17th century. The last significant wave of immigrants from Ukraine arrived in Belarus during the Soviet Union.

For many years, Belarusians and Ukrainians were not separated in documents. The identification of the two peoples took place, as a rule, on the basis of common religion (Eastern Orthodox and Greek Catholic Christianity) and under the common name of Ruthenians, Tutejszy, or Poleshuks.

Current status 
Unlike many other ethnic minorities in Belarus, such as Roma and Jews, Ukrainians do not face significant discrimination, and multiple members of the government, including President Alexander Lukashenko, are ethnic Ukrainians. The Ukrainian population has multiple organisations dedicated to assistance of the ethnic Ukrainian community (including  and ), most of which are primarily based in Brest Region.

Population 

Historically, Ukrainians made up a large population of the Belarusian population; in the 1897 census, there were 362,800 Ukrainians in Grodno Governorate, making up 22.9% of the total population of the time. In Kobrinsky and Brestsky Uyezds, Ukrainians made up the majority of the population, at 79.6% and 64.4% of the population, respectively.

In 2009, Ukrainians made up 1.7% of the total population of Belarus, with 158,723 people. The population is primarily located in southern Belarus, and concentrated particularly in Brest Region, but substantial populations exist in all regions of the country. The region with the lowest Ukrainian population is Vitebsk Region, where Ukrainians make up 1.18% of the population.

Language 
Per the 2009 census, many Ukrainians in Belarus have continued to use the Ukrainian language, unlike many other groups such as Lipka Tatars - 29.2% of the total Ukrainian Belarusian population uses it. However, at the same time, a trend of russification has developed among the Ukrainian population; 61.2% of all Ukrainians use the Russian language. By comparison, very few have been inclined to speak the Belarusian language, with only 7.9% of the total Ukrainian population speaking it.

Notable people 

 Svetlana Alexievich, author and pro-democracy activist
 Jury Chaščavacki, pro-democracy activist
 Vassili Nesterenko, physicist
 Aleksandr Potupa, philosopher and pro-democracy activist
 Lidia Yermoshina, chairwoman of the Central Election Commission of Belarus
 Yuri Zisser, programmer and pro-democracy activist, founder of Tut.By

Notes

References 

Ethnic groups in Belarus
Ukrainian diaspora
Belarusian people of Ukrainian descent